Tench Coxe (May 22, 1755July 17, 1824) was an American political economist and a delegate for Pennsylvania to the Continental Congress in 1788–1789. He wrote under the pseudonym "A Pennsylvanian," and was known to his political enemies as "Mr. Facing Bothways."

Biography
Coxe was born in Philadelphia, Pennsylvania on May 22, 1755. His mother was a daughter of Tench Francis Sr. His father came of a family well known in American affairs. His great-grandfather was the governor of West Jersey, Dr. Daniel Coxe.

Tench received his education in the Philadelphia schools and intended to study law, but his father determined to make him a merchant, and he was placed in the counting-house of Coxe & Furman, becoming a partner at the age of twenty-one.

After Patriots took power, Coxe left Philadelphia for a few months, only to return when British General Howe occupied the city in September 1777. Coxe remained in Philadelphia after the British departed in 1778, and some Patriots accused him of having Royalist sympathies and of having served (briefly) in the British army. Coxe's trading successes during the period of British occupation lent considerable support to the charges, and he was arrested; although nothing came of the allegations and he was pardoned. The Pennsylvania militia records of 1780, 1787, and 1788 listed Coxe as a militia private. Of the militia, Coxe wrote,

Coxe became a Whig and began a long political career. In 1786 he was sent to the Annapolis Convention and in 1788 to the Continental Congress. In September of 1787, Coxe wrote three articles published in the Independent Gazetteer (Philadelphia) with the name “An American Citizen” examining the newly minted U.S. Constitution with a focus on the Presidency and the two houses of Congress and contrasting it – favorably – to the British Constitution.

Coxe next became a Federalist. A proponent of industrialization during the early years of the United States, Coxe co-authored the famous Report on Manufactures (1791) with Alexander Hamilton, providing much of the statistical data. He had been appointed Assistant Secretary of the Treasury on September 11, 1789 under Alexander Hamilton when Hamilton was Secretary of the Treasury. Coxe also headed a group called the Manufacturing Society of Philadelphia. He was appointed revenue commissioner by President George Washington on June 30, 1792, and served until removed by President John Adams. In 1796, he was elected to the American Philosophical Society.

Coxe then turned Democratic-Republican, and in the canvass of 1800 published Adams' famous letter to him regarding Pinckney. For this he was reviled by the federalists as a renegade, a tory, and a British guide, and President Thomas Jefferson rewarded him by an appointment as Purveyor of Public Supplies; he served from 1803 to 1812.

In 1804 Coxe organized and led a group at Philadelphia opposed to the election to congress of Michael Leib, and this brought him again into public notice. Though a Democratic-Republican, he was for three months daily abused by the Aurora. He was called a tory, a Federal rat, a British guide who had entered Philadelphia in 1777 with laurel in his hat, and his group was nicknamed the "quids." The term is commonly supposed to have been first applied to the little band led by John Randolph in 1806, but this is a mistake.

Coxe was a writer on political and economic subjects and a champion of tariffs to protect the new nation's growing industries. He wrote also on naval power, on encouragement of arts and manufactures, on the cost, trade, and manufacture of cotton, on the navigation act, and on arts and manufactures in the United States. He deserves, indeed, to be called the father of the American cotton industry. He was the first to attempt to bring an Arkwright machine to the United States, the first to urge Southerners to raise cotton. Coxe also acquired vast acreage of Pennsylvania timber and coal lands. This investment in lands though not much developed in Tench Coxe lifetime was the basis of wealth for his descendants.

Coxe died July 17, 1824 in Philadelphia, where he is interred in Christ Church Burial Ground.

His grandson Colonel Frank Coxe built Battery Park Hotel in Asheville, North Carolina and bought Green River Plantation in Polk County, North Carolina. His grandson, Eckley Coxe, founded MMI Preparatory School in Freeland, Pennsylvania.

Works

References

Further reading
 Jacob Cooke, Tench Coxe and the Early Republic; 1978, Univ. of North Carolina Press, 
 Jacob E. Cooke, "Tench Coxe, Alexander Hamilton, and the Encouragement of American Manufactures," The William and Mary Quarterly, 3rd Ser., Vol. 32, No. 3 (July 1975), pp. 369–92
 The Coxe Papers, edited by Lucy Fisher West, are held by the Historical Society of Pennsylvania; they are available in West's Guide to the Microfilm of the Papers of Tench Coxe in the Coxe Family Papers at the Historical Society of Pennsylvania (Philadelphia, 1977)
 Stephen P. Halbrook & David B. Kopel, "Tench Coxe and the Right to Keep and Bear Arms, 1787–1823," Volume 7, Issue 2, William & Mary Bill of Rights Journal, pp. 347–99 (Feb. 1999)
 Hutcheson, Harold, Tench Coxe : a study in American economic development. New York : AMS Press, [1982, c1938], ISBN: 0404613950
 See David Kopel's site https://davekopel.org/2A/LawRev/hk-coxe.htm for more.

External links

 Tench Coxe Page on Facebook
 The Coxe Family Papers 1638-1970, highlighting the life of Tench Coxe, and the Coxe Family Mining Papers, 1774–1968, documenting one of the largest independent anthracite coal mining interests in the nation, are available for research use at the Historical Society of Pennsylvania.

1755 births
1824 deaths
Continental Congressmen from Pennsylvania
18th-century American politicians
Scientists from Philadelphia
Writers from Philadelphia
Burials at Christ Church, Philadelphia
People of colonial Pennsylvania
Economists from Pennsylvania
United States Purveyor of Public Supplies